Gebiidea is an infraorder of decapod crustaceans.  Gebiidea and Axiidea are divergent infraoders of the former infraorder Thalassinidea. These infraorders have converged ecologically and morphologically as burrowing forms.  Based on molecular evidence as of 2009, it is now widely believed that these two infraorders represent two distinct lineages separate from one another.  Since this is a recent change, much of the literature and research surrounding these infraorders still refers to the Axiidea and Gebiidea in combination as "thalassinidean" for the sake of clarity and reference. This division based on molecular evidence is consistent with the groupings proposed by Robert Gurney in 1938 based on larval developmental stages.

The infraorder Gebiidea belongs to the clade Reptantia, which consists of the walking/crawling decapods (lobsters and crabs).  The cladogram below shows Gebiidea's placement within the larger order Decapoda, from analysis by Wolfe et al., 2019.

Gebiidea comprises the following families:
Axianassidae Schmitt, 1924
Laomediidae Borradaile, 1903
Thalassinidae Latreille, 1831
Upogebiidae Borradaile, 1903

References

Thalassinidea
Arthropod infraorders